Gabriel Alexander Hughes (born August 22, 2001) is an American professional baseball pitcher in the Colorado Rockies organization.

Amateur career
Hughes attended Rocky Mountain High School in Meridian, Idaho. In 2018, his junior year, he had a 7–1 win-loss record with a 1.84 earned run average (ERA) and 59 strikeouts while batting .461. He was named the Idaho Gatorade Baseball Player of the Year. As a senior in 2019, he went 7–1 with a 0.95 ERA and 65 strikeouts alongside batting .365 with seven home runs and was named the Idaho Gatorade Baseball Player of the Year for the second straight season. That summer, he played in the West Coast League for the Bellingham Bells. Unselected in the 2019 Major League Baseball draft, he enrolled at Gonzaga University to play college baseball for the Gonzaga Bulldogs.

As a freshman at Gonzaga in 2020, Hughes posted a 0.77 ERA with 13 strikeouts over  innings before the season was cancelled due to the COVID-19 pandemic. He spent the summer playing in the Northwoods League for the Great Lakes Resorters. In 2021, as a redshirt freshman, he started ten games and went 4–3 with a 3.23 ERA and 67 strikeouts over  innings while also starting 31 games at first base, batting .247 with three home runs. His season ended early after breaking a knuckle while batting. That summer, he was selected to play for the USA Baseball Collegiate National Team. Hughes entered the 2022 season as a preseason All-American and Gonzaga's number one starter. He also switched his focus solely to pitching after being a two-way player in previous seasons. He started 15 games over the course of the season and went 8–3 with a 3.21 ERA and 138 strikeouts over 98 innings. Following the season's end, he traveled to San Diego where he participated in the Draft Combine.

Professional career
The Colorado Rockies selected Hughes in the first round with the tenth overall selection of the 2022 Major League Baseball draft. He signed with the team for $4 million. He made his professional debut with the Fresno Grizzlies of the Single-A California League with whom he made one appearance, pitching three scoreless innings.

Personal life
Hughes's grandfather, Donald, played in the minor leagues for the Detroit Tigers.
 Hughes has five siblings, four of whom are adopted.

References

External links
Gonzaga Bulldogs bio

2001 births
Living people
Baseball players from Idaho
Baseball pitchers
Gonzaga Bulldogs baseball players
United States national baseball team players
All-American college baseball players